Laccaria laccata, commonly known as the deceiver, or waxy laccaria, is a white-spored species of small edible mushroom found throughout North America and Europe. It is a highly variable mushroom (hence 'deceiver'), and can look quite washed out, colorless and drab, but when younger it often assumes red, pinkish brown, and orange tones. The species is often considered by mushroom collectors to be a 'mushroom weed' because of its abundance and plain stature.

Taxonomy 
The deceiver was first described by Tyrolian naturalist Giovanni Antonio Scopoli in 1772 as Agaricus laccatus, before being given its current binomial name by Mordecai Cubitt Cooke in 1884. The specific epithet is derived from the Latin adjective laccatus 'varnished' or 'shining'. Clitocybe laccata is an old alternative name. Var. pallidifolia, described by Charles Horton Peck, is the most common variety found in North America.

It is the type species of the cosmopolitan mushroom genus Laccaria; where their relations lie among the gilled mushrooms is unclear, but they are currently classified in the family Hydnangiaceae.

The deceiver gets its common name from its variable appearance. Other names include lacklustre laccaria, and, by the Zapotec people, Beshia ladhi biinii (also the name of other members of Laccaria).

Description 
It can be various shades of salmon pink, brick-red, or shades of orange or brown when moist or young, and duller and paler when dry. The irregular gills are widely spaced and decurrent or adnexed, and of similar color to the cap, though whiten with spores as the mushroom matures. The spore print is white, and the round spiny spores are 7–10 μm in diameter. The flesh is thin and has little taste.

Formerly considered a subspecies by French mycologist René Maire, the close deceiver (Laccaria proxima) is a European relative with a fine scaly cap and found in wetter habitats. Microscopically, its spores are narrower and more oval-shaped.

In California, what was thought to be L. laccata under eucalyptus has turned out to be the Australian species Laccaria fraterna. Other similar species include Laccaria amethysteo-occidentalis and Laccaria bicolor.

Distribution and habitat 
Laccaria laccata is found in scattered troops in wooded areas, and on heathland often in poor soil. It is very common in all of the northern temperate zones, but tends to favor cool weather. L. laccata is mycorrhizal with several types of trees, including members of the Pinaceae (Pines), Fagaceae (Beech), and Betulaceae (Birch). It is found across Europe and North America, south into Mexico and Costa Rica. Laccaria species are mycorrhizal, and thought by some to be pioneer species.

Edibility 
Although small, the deceiver is edible and mild-tasting. The tough stalks are usually not eaten. It is one of many mushrooms traditionally eaten by the Zapotec people of Oaxaca in Mexico. However, it is important to distinguish it from potentially lethal small brown mushrooms.

References

External links 

 Laccaria laccata var. laccata at the Field Museum of Natural History website

Edible fungi
laccata
Fungi of Europe
Fungi of North America
Taxa named by Giovanni Antonio Scopoli